The 2019 season was the 122nd season of competitive football in Sweden. The men's team attempted to qualify for UEFA Euro 2020, and the women's team participated in the 2019 FIFA Women's World Cup.

Domestic results

Men's football

2019 Allsvenskan

2020 Allsvenskan play-offs

Kalmar won 4–2 on aggregate.

2019 Superettan

2020 Superettan play-offs

Öster won 2–1 on aggregate.

''3–3 on aggregate. Umeå won on away goals.

National teams

Sweden men's national football team

UEFA Euro 2020 qualifying

Group F

Friendlies

Total results summary

Sweden national under-21 football team

2021 UEFA Euro Under-21 Championship qualification

Group 1

Friendlies

Total results summary

Sweden national under-19 football team

2020 UEFA European Under-19 Championship qualification

Group 9

Sweden national under-17 football team

2019 UEFA European Under-17 Championship qualification Elite Round

Group 8

2019 UEFA European Under-17 Championship

Group B

Four-nation tournament

Total results summary

Sweden women's national football team

2019 FIFA Women's World Cup

Group stage

Knock-out stage

UEFA Women's Euro 2021 qualifying

Group F

2019 Algarve Cup

Group D

Third place play-off

Friendlies

Total results summary

References 

 
Seasons in Swedish football